Zuby may refer to:
Zuby, British rapper (1986–)
Zuby (settlement), a settlement in Poland